Qaleh Tak, also rendered as Ghaleh Tak, may refer to:
 Qaleh Tak, Kiar
 Qaleh Tak, Kuhrang